Clitocybe odora, also known as the aniseed toadstool, is a blue-green mushroom that grows near deciduous and coniferous trees. They can be found growing in small groups along the side of tree roots. This mushroom is edible, but a few expert mushroom hunters insist that young specimens should be avoided as can be confused with Stropharia aeruginosa. The anise odor is due to the presence of p-anisaldehyde and a small amount of benzaldehyde. This odor can give away the mushroom's presence before it is observed by eye.

Taxonomy
First described by the French mycologist Jean Baptiste Francois Pierre Bulliard (1742–1793). The specific epithet odora is from the Latin meaning "perfumed".

Description
Young specimens have a light blue texture on the cap which fades to grey in age. The gills and stem are white with no ring.

Full grown specimens have blue-green, flowery, cup-shaped caps; the gills are creamy white, or reflect the blue-green color of the cap. The cap's surface feels rough. The stem is thick, is attached to the gills with no rings, and is textured, with a pale-yellow colour. The younger ones have a bell-shaped cap with a light blue or icy blue colour. The gills and stem are white, or bluish green.  It has a strong scent and taste of aniseed, hence its name.

There is a white variety (Clitocybe odora var.alba Lange) that has the same strong odour.

Distribution and habitat
Found in both deciduous, and coniferous woods, it is widespread in the temperate zones, occurring in Asia, Europe, and North America. On the East Coast of North America it favours oak woodland, but it is often abundant in the coniferous forests of the Pacific Northwest.

Edibility
The caps can be dried, and used as a condiment, or used fresh for flavouring. Mushroom hunters should be sure to pick mature ones, mainly because the younger ones can be confused with several similar poisonous ones that grow along with this mushroom. Every part of the mushroom should be examined before collecting for the table. Also, the stem and the cut cap should be checked to see if there are any fly larvae. Some guides recommend avoiding eating the species.

References

External links

 Volatile composition of fresh Clitocybe odora fruiting bodies
 Mycologia - The anise-like odor of Clitocybe odora, Lentinellus cochleatus and Agaricus essettei
 healing-mushrooms.net's entry on Clitocybe odora

odora
Edible fungi
Fungi of Europe
Taxa named by Jean Baptiste François Pierre Bulliard
Fungi described in 1784